Jessica Nelson may refer to:

Jesy Nelson (born 1991), Jessica Nelson, singer
Jessica Nelson (American football), player for Miami Caliente
Jessica Nelson (filmmaker), producer of Pink Eye (film)
Jessica Nelson, co-founder of SP Books

See also
Jessica Nelson North, poet
Jessie Nelson (disambiguation)